The 2008 Primera División de Chile is the 77th season of top-flight football in Chile, and the 7th under its current format.

Torneo Apertura 

The Torneo Apertura "Copa BancoEstado" opened the 2008 season on January 25. The 20 teams were organized into four groups, but played each other in a single round-robin format. The top-two teams from each group advanced to a single elimination play-off, but the best 3rd-place team had to worst 2nd-place team in an advancement play-off match. The winner of the tournament will be crowned the Apertura champion, and will earn a spot in the 2009 Copa Libertadores Group Stage. The champion and runner-up with earn spots in the 2008 Copa Sudamericana.

First phase

Group standings

Play-off match

Playoff stage

Finals

Top-five goalscorers

Torneo Clausura 

The Torneo Clausura "Copa BancoEstado" began on June 21. The format is the same as the Apertura tournament, but the field was reduced from 20 teams to 19 since Deportes Concepción withdrew before the start of the tournament due to financial problems. The best-placed team in the first stage earned a spot in the First Stage of the 2009 Copa Libertadores. The tournament champion will earn a spot in the 2009 Copa Libertadores Group Stage. Relegation will be determined at the end of this tournament.

First phase

Group standings

Play-off match

Knock-out round

Top-five goalscorers

Relegation 
Four teams were relegated this year to reduce the field for next season to 18 teams.

Aggregate table 
The aggregate table is only a sum of the two first-stages from the Apertura and Clausura tournaments. The bottom-two teams are relegated from the results of this table.

Relegation table 
The next two teams to be relegated were determined through a special aggregate table for the 2007 & 2008 season. The teams' performances were put under a specific formula (shown below) and then ranked. The two worst teams who have not been relegated by this season's aggregate table were relegated.

In the case of Rangers, Provincial Osorno, and Santiago Morning, the following formula was used since they were not in the Primera División in the 2007 season:

In both formulas, Pd is the relegation average; P2007 is the total points earned in the 2007 season; PAp-2008 is the points earned in this season's Apertura tournament; PCl-2008 is the points earned in this season's Clausura tournament.

Relegation/promotion play-off 
The 15th & 16th place team in the aggregate table have to play two promotion/relegation matches the Segunda División runner-up (Puerto Montt) and the winner of the Segunda División Apertura/Clausura play-off (Coquimbo Unido). The winners will play in the Primera División the next season.

See also 
 Chilean Primera División
 List of 2008 Primera División de Chile transfers

 
Primera División de Chile seasons
Chile
1